Nick Graham (born 10 January 1974) is an Australian former rugby league footballer who played as a  and  forward in the 1990s and 2000s.

He played for the Wests Tigers and the Cronulla-Sutherland Sharks in the NRL. He also played for the Wigan Warriors in the Super League.

Background
Graham was born in Caringbah, New South Wales, Australia.

Playing career
Graham was a club stalwart at the Sharks during the late 1990s, and up until the arrival of Chris Anderson at the club at the beginning of 2003. Nick Graham was controversially axed by Anderson alongside fellow Sharks club stalwart Dean Treister only five matches into the season. While Treister left the club to play for Hull F.C. in the UK, Graham decided to stay at the club and try to win back his first-grade spot.

He later left during the 2003 season to play for the Wigan Warriors in the English Super League for the duration of the year. He returned to Australia and played his final season for the Wests Tigers in 2004. After only featuring in 10 matches Graham decided to retire at the season's end.

Representative games
City: Played one game for city in Country/City Origin

Career highlights
Junior Club: De La Salle (Cronulla)
Career Stats: 145 career games to date scoring 16 tries

References

External links
Nick Graham NRL Player Profile

1974 births
Australian rugby league players
Rugby league locks
Cronulla-Sutherland Sharks players
Wests Tigers players
New South Wales City Origin rugby league team players
Wigan Warriors players
Living people